Fritz Feuz (born 28 April 1931) is a Swiss gymnast. He competed at the 1960 Summer Olympics and the 1964 Summer Olympics.

References

External links
 

1931 births
Living people
Swiss male artistic gymnasts
Olympic gymnasts of Switzerland
Gymnasts at the 1960 Summer Olympics
Gymnasts at the 1964 Summer Olympics
Sportspeople from the canton of Bern
20th-century Swiss people